International Youth Day (IYD) is an awareness day designated by the United Nations.  The purpose of the day is to draw attention to a given set of cultural and legal issues surrounding youth. The first IYD was observed on 12 August, 2000.

Background
International Youth Day is observed annually on August 12th. It is meant as an opportunity for governments and others to draw attention to youth issues worldwide. During IYD, concerts, workshops, cultural events, and meetings involving national and local government officials and youth organizations take place around the world. IYD was designated by the United Nations in 1999 with the adoption of Resolution 54/120.

International Youth Day's Slogan for 2014 was Youth and Mental Health. For 2015, it was Youth and Civic Engagement. The theme of the 2016 International Youth Day was “The Road to 2030: Eradicating Poverty and Achieving Sustainable Consumption and Production." For 2017, the theme of IYD is "Youth Building Peace". The theme for IYD 2018 was "Safe Spaces for Youth". For 2019, the theme of IYD was "Transforming education" to make education inclusive and accessible for all youth. And for 2020, the theme of IYD was "Youth Engagement for Global Action". The theme for 2021 IYD is "Transforming Food Systems: Youth Innovation for Human and Planetary Health" The theme for 2022 is "Intergenerational solidarity: Creating a world for all ages”.

Associated events

Each youth day is associated with a number of events around the world. These included, in 2013:
International Youth Conference 2013: held on August 10-August 11, 2013 before the International Youth Day on August 12. This conference comprised speakers from various countries and fields of work, followed by youth awards ceremony, and spirit kindling debates and discussions. It was hosted by, YOUTHINK, Youth Exnora and the US consulate general, Chennai.

IYC'13 hosted by:
YOUTHINK
Youth Exnora
US consulate general, Chennai

IYD '18 and IYD '19 hosted by Indian Youth Cafe, Chennai. The event has its own specialty in empowering the youth power.

References

External links
 International Youth Day (United Nations)

August observances
Youth Day, International
Recurring events established in 2000